The Association des Écrivains et Artistes Révolutionnaires (AEAR) was a French association of revolutionary artists and writers active between 1932 and 1939.

An association of the same name was formed in 2006.

The AEAR was founded by communist and communist-sympathizing writers in March 1932 as the French section of the International Union of Revolutionary Writers, established by the Comintern in the Soviet Union in 1930. Leading figures included Paul Vaillant-Couturier, Léon Moussinac, Charles Vildrac and Francis Jourdain.

Originally the task of the organization was to promote Soviet art and culture but later under the direction Vaillant-Couturier, members of the AEAR mobilized against war and fascism after the organization released the brochure "Those who have chosen, Against fascism in Germany. Against French imperialism". Together with the Fédération Musicale Populaire (FMP), the organization played a key role in introducing Soviet music to France. Among other activities, the AEAR published the journal Commune.

Notable members 
 Henri-Georges Adam
 Louis Aragon
 Yves Allégret
 Henri Barbusse
 Jacques-André Boiffard
 Henri Cartier-Bresson
 André Breton (left the group in 1933)
 Luis Buñuel
 Claude Cahun (civil name Lucy Schwob)
 Robert Capa
 André Chamson
 René Crevel 
 Robert Desnos
 Paul Éluard
 Marx Ernst
 Élie Faure
 André Gide
 Jean Giono
 Francis Jourdain
 Jean Lévy
 Max Lingner
 Eli Lotar
 Dora Maar
 André Malraux
 Frans Masereel
 Suzanne Malherbe (alias Marcel Moore)
 Léon Moussinac
 Paul Nizan
 Jean Painlevé
 Édouard Pignon
 Man Ray (briefly)
 Romain Rolland 
 Paul Nizan
 Benjamin Peret
 Charlotte Perriand
 Georges Politzer
 Vladimir Pozner
 Marie-Claude Vaillant-Couturier
 Paul Vaillant-Couturier
 Tristan Rémy
 Jean Vigo
 Charles Vildrac

References

External links 
 AEAR created in 2006

French art
French literature
French writers' organizations
Arts organizations based in France
Ecrivains et Artistes
1932 establishments in France
1939 disestablishments in France
Arts organizations established in 1932
Organizations disestablished in 1939